La vida breve  (Spanish Life is Short or The Brief Life) is an opera in two acts and four scenes by Manuel de Falla to an original Spanish libretto by Carlos Fernández-Shaw. Local (Andalusian) dialect is used.  It was written between August 1904 and March 1905, but not produced until 1913.  The first performance was given (in a French translation by Paul Millet) at the Casino Municipal in Nice on 1 April 1913. Paris and Madrid performances followed, later in 1913 and in 1914 respectively.  Claude Debussy played a major role in influencing Falla to transform it from the number opera it was at its Nice premiere to an opera with a more continuous musical texture and more mature orchestration.  This revision was first heard at the Paris premiere at the Opéra-Comique in December 1913, and is the standard version.

Only an hour long, the complete opera is seldom performed today, but its orchestral sections are, especially the act 2 music published as Interlude and Dance, which is popular at concerts of Spanish music. (Fritz Kreisler in 1926 arranged for violin and piano the dance from this pairing under the spurious title Danse espagnole.) Indeed the opera is unusual for having nearly as much instrumental music as vocal: act 1, scene 2 consists entirely of a short symphonic poem (with distant voices) called Intermedio, depicting sunset in Granada; act 2, Scene 1 includes the above-referenced Danza and Interludio, with the latter ending the scene, i.e. in the opposite sequence to the excerpted pairing; and act 2, scene 2 begins with the a second and longer Danza (with vocal punctuation).

The role of Salud is central to the action. It has been sung by, among others, soprano Victoria de los Ángeles, mezzo-soprano Teresa Berganza, mezzo Martha Senn, and, more recently, soprano Cristina Gallardo-Domâs.

Roles

Synopsis
Time: 20th century
Place: Granada

Act 1
Afternoon and sunset in the (gypsy) Albaicín district

A male chorus of anvil workers plies their trade at the local forge. The young gypsy, Salud, is passionately in love with a young well-to-do man named Paco. She does not know, and Paco does not tell her, that he is already engaged to a woman of his social class. Her uncle, Sarvaor (Salvador), and her grandmother (La abuela) have discovered this, and they try to prevent Salud from interrupting Paco's wedding after she learns the truth.

Act 2
A wealthier part of the city: in front of a house on whose patio wedding festivities are in progress (and visible from the street), and then in the patio itself 

Confrontation (which from several perspectives is the theme of the whole opera) occurs after Salud and Sarvaor gate-crash the festivities, astonishing the bride and the guests and momentarily throwing the mendacious groom so much off his guard that he utters Salud's name before denying he knows her and ordering her ejection. Her heart broken, Salud falls dead at his feet, in what is said to be the ultimate gesture of contempt for a former lover.

Recordings
There are 11 complete recordings, as of February 2012. Cast key is Conductor / Salud, La abuela, Paco, El tío Sarvaor:
 Halffter / Victoria de los Ángeles, Rosario Gómez, Pablo Civil, Emilio Payá - HMV, 1954
 Toldrà / Victoria de los Ángeles, Rosario Gómez, Bernabé Martí, Joaquín Deus - Ediciones FVdA, 1958, live in Edinburgh
 Frühbeck de Burgos / Victoria de los Ángeles, Ines Rivadeneira, Carlo Cossutta, Victor de Narké - EMI, 1965
 García Navarro / Teresa Berganza, Alicia Nafé, José Carreras, Juan Pons - Deutsche Grammophon, 1978
 López Cobos / Alicia Nafé, Catherine Keen, Antonio Ordóñez, Michael Wadsworth - Telarc, 1992
 Mata / Martha Senn, Cecilia Angell, Fernando de la Mora, William Alvarado - Dorian, 1993
 García Navarro / María José Montiel, Alicia Nafé, Giacomo Aragall, Alfonso Echeverría - RTVE (DVD), 1997, live in Madrid
 Josep Pons / Inmaculada Egido, Mabel Perelstein, Antonio Ordóñez, Enrique Baquerizo - Harmonia Mundi, 1997
 Frühbeck de Burgos / Maria Rodríguez, Paola Pelliciari, César Hernández, Marcello Lippi - Dynamic, 2001, live in Cagliari
 Valdés / Ana María Sánchez, Alicia Nafé, Vicente Ombuena Valls, Alfonso Echeverría - Naxos, 2002, live in Oviedo
 Maazel / Cristina Gallardo-Domâs, María Luisa Corbacho, Jorge de León Paco, Felipe Bou - C Major (DVD), 2010, live in Valencia

References

External links
 
 , performed by Itzhak Perlman and Samuel Sanders

Operas by Manuel de Falla
Spanish-language operas
1905 operas
Operas
Operas set in Spain